The Quan River is a major river in Henan province of China. It is the largest tributary of the Ying River which is a part of the Huai River watershed system. Its total length is about 241 km, 120 km of which in the upstream section is also called Fen River. It flows into the Ying River in Anhui province.

References

Rivers of Henan